Lean, leaning or LEAN may refer to:

Business practices
 Lean thinking, a business methodology adopted in various fields
 Lean construction, an adaption of lean manufacturing principles to the design and construction process
 Lean government, application of lean thinking to government
 Lean higher education, application of lean manufacturing principles in Higher Education
 Lean integration, application of lean manufacturing principles to data and systems integration
 Lean IT, application of lean manufacturing principles to the development and management of information technology (IT) products and services
 Lean laboratory, application of lean manufacturing principles in a laboratory
 Lean manufacturing, a process improvement discipline 
 Lean product development, lean thinking applied to product development
 Lean project management, application of lean concepts to project management
 Lean services, application of lean manufacturing principles in a service operation
 Lean software development, lean manufacturing principles applied to software development
 Lean startup, how to start a company in a lean way

Other uses
 Lean (proof assistant), a mathematics tool
 Lean (drug), based on cough syrup
 Le'an County, in Jiangxi, China
 Lean meat, meat with little fat content
 An alternate name of lake trout (Salvelinus namaycush), a fish
 A slight advantage for one candidate in political forecasting

People with the surname
 David Lean, English film director, producer and editor
 Hooi Hooi Lean, Malaysian economist
 Big Lean, a Canadian rapper
 Yung Lean, a Swedish musician

See also
 LARGe SCM, Integration of Lean with Agile, Resilience, and Green in Supply Chain Management
 Lien (disambiguation)
 Leen (disambiguation)
 Leane (disambiguation)